Cleber Luciano Born December 15th 1973 is a Brazilian professional mixed martial artist currently competing in the featherweight division.

Background
Born and raised in Brazil, Luciano began judo at the age of five and Brazilian jiu-jitsu at the age of seven, and received his BJJ black belt at the age of 19. Luciano is a seven-time BJJ World Champion, a six-time Brazilian BJJ Champion, a five-time Brazilian State BJJ Champion, a three-time World No Gi Champion, a six-time Pan Am Champion, and is a three-time U.S. Open Champion, among various other titles.

Mixed martial arts record

|-
|Win
|align=center|12-5
|Ramiro Hernandez
|Decision (unanimous)
|Title Quest - Hernandez vs. Luciano
|
|align=center|3
|align=center|5:00
|Danbury, Wisconsin, United States
|
|-
|Win
|align=center|11-5
|Aaron Miller
|Submission (armbar)
|Bellator 136
|
|align=center|2
|align=center|4:36
|Irvine, California, United States
|Catchweight bout of 150 lbs.
|-
|Win
|align=center|10-5
|Patrick Conroy
|Submission (kimura)
|MMAADU: MMA Down Under 5
|
|align=center|1
|align=center|N/A
|Findon, South Australia, Australia
|
|-
|Win
|align=center|9-5
|Joe Camacho
|Decision (unanimous)
|Bellator 106
|
|align=center|3
|align=center|5:00
|Long Beach, California, United States
|Catchweight bout of 150 lbs.
|-
|Loss
|align=center|8-5
|Nick Piedmont
|TKO (punches)
|Bellator 92
|
|align=center|1
|align=center|0:55
|Temecula, California, United States
|
|-
|Win
|align=center|8-4
|Mario Navarro
|Decision (unanimous)
|Bellator 85
|
|align=center|3
|align=center|5:00
|Irvine, California, United States
|Featherweight bout.
|-
|Win
|align=center|7-4
|Chad Freeman
|Submission (rear-naked choke)
|FFL 2
|
|align=center|1
|align=center|0:59
|Prince George, British Columbia, Canada
|
|-
|Win
|align=center|6-4
|Xavier Stokes
|Submission (armbar)
|LBFN 14
|
|align=center|3
|align=center|2:59
|Long Beach, California, United States
|Catchweight bout of 160 lbs.
|-
|Loss
|align=center|5-4
|Chris Saunders
|KO (punches)
|IFS 7
|
|align=center|2
|align=center|0:22
|Pico Rivera, California, United States
|
|-
|Win
|align=center|5-3
|Tony Llamas
|Submission (rear-naked choke)
|LBFN 10
|
|align=center|1
|align=center|0:29
|Long Beach, California, United States
|
|-
|Win
|align=center|4-3
|Todd Willingham
|Submission (rear-naked choke)
|PWP: War on the Mainland
|
|align=center|2
|align=center|3:18
|Irvine, California, United States
|
|-
|Win
|align=center|3-3
|Mateo Pena
|Submission (armbar)
|TWC 7
|
|align=center|1
|align=center|2:11
|Porterville, California, United States
|
|-
|Win
|align=center|2-3
|Tony Llamas
|Submission (rear-naked choke)
|TWC 5
|
|align=center|1
|align=center|0:54
|Porterville, California, United States
|
|-
|Loss
|align=center|1-3
|Evan Dunham
|Submission (guillotine choke)
|PFP: Ring of Fire
|
|align=center|3
|align=center|N/A
|Manila, Philippines
|
|-
|Loss
|align=center|1-2
|Preston Scharf
|Decision (unanimous)
|EFWC: The Untamed
|
|align=center|3
|align=center|5:00
|Anaheim, California, United States
|
|-
|Loss
|align=center|1-1
|Fabiano Iha
|KO (punch)
|EC 22
|
|align=center|1
|align=center|7:57
|West Valley City, Utah, United States
|
|-
|Win
|align=center|1–0
|Victor Hunsaker
|TKO (punches)
|EC 22
|
|align=center|1
|align=center|6:20
|West Valley City, Utah, United States
|

See also
 List of male mixed martial artists

References

External links

Brazilian male mixed martial artists
Featherweight mixed martial artists
Mixed martial artists utilizing judo
Mixed martial artists utilizing Brazilian jiu-jitsu
Living people
Brazilian practitioners of Brazilian jiu-jitsu
People awarded a black belt in Brazilian jiu-jitsu
Brazilian male judoka
1973 births